"Zing! Went the Strings of My Heart" is a 1935 popular song with words and music by James F. Hanley.  It was introduced by Hal Le Roy and Eunice Healey in the Broadway revue Thumbs Up!

The most notable recordings were made by Judy Garland, who recorded it numerous times, including in the 1938 film Listen, Darling and for Decca Records in 1939. It later became a standard number in her concerts and TV shows when she performed it as an up-tempo arrangement by Nelson Riddle from her 1958 Capitol album.

The Coasters released a rock & roll version in April 1958 as the flip side of their #1 hit "Yakety Yak". This version would inspire the British band The Move to record the song in the late '60s.  In 1962, the song was recorded by the Furys.

In 1972, a recording by the Trammps reached No. 17 on the Billboard, Best Selling Soul Singles chart and No. 64 on the Hot 100.

References

1934 songs
Songs written by James F. Hanley
Judy Garland songs
The Trammps songs
1930s jazz standards
Buddah Records singles